WordCrex is a mobile app similar to the famous word game Scrabble and Wordfeud. The iOS-version was released June 2, 2016 and the Android-version 8 September 2016. The game was presented as the first free fair word game challenge. WordCrex was developed by two Dutch creative friends Jelle Verwaijen and Dimitri Dirkzwager.  It is different than most word games because the players use the same set of seven letters to form words. This way the luck factor of getting the right letters is not a decisive factor anymore. WordCrex is a multiplayer game. Games can be played with 2, 3 or 4 players per game.

The game can be played at the date of release in 43 languages in around 200 countries available for almost 4 billion people. Which makes the game the word game with the most playable languages. Exceeding Scrabble which is playable in 29 languages and Wordfeud that has 12. With a special focus on the smaller languages like Esperanto, Basque, Brittonic and Frisian WordCrex offers a playful and educational way to learn and rehears these languages.

Languages 
Languages available in WordCrex:

Publications 
At the time of release WordCrex got a lot of media attention being the fair alternative to Wordfeud and Scrabble.

See also 
 Television item in regional news broadcast on Omroep Brabant: Win jij ook nooit bij Wordfeud? WordCrex is het Brabantse antwoord.
 Article in Dutch regional newspaper BN DeStem: In Breda bedacht: spelletjesapp WordCrex na ergernis over Wordfeud.
 Review by iCulture.nl a big Apple blog website in the Netherlands: Review: WordCrex, een variant op Wordfeud met gelijke kansen.
 Article in Frisian daily newspaper Leeuwarder Courant: Variant op Wordfeud ook in het Fries.

References

External links 
 Website WordCrex

Scrabble variants
Scrabble software